Jazz Roots: McCoy Tyner Honors Jazz Piano Legends of the 20th Century  is a solo piano album by McCoy Tyner released on the Telarc label in 2000.

Reception
The Allmusic review by Paula Edelstein states that "The songs and artists McCoy Tyner has selected to pay tribute to are all great examples of his excellent ability to blend these various sources of inspiration and his compositional integrity into a coherent, persuasive whole. Nowhere is this clearer or more meaningful than on these solo concerts".

Track listing
 "A Night in Tunisia" (Gillespie) - 2:54  
 "Pannonica" (Monk) - 3:37  
 "My Foolish Heart" (Young) - 4:20  
 "Don't Get Around Much Anymore" (Ellington, Russell) - 4:26  
 "Blues for Fatha" - 4:00  
 "Sweet and Lovely" (Arnheim, LeMare, Tobias) - 4:06  
 "Lullaby of Birdland" (Shearing, Weiss) - 3:35  
 "You Taught My Heart to Sing" (Cahn, Tyner) - 5:40  
 "Happy Days" - 5:50  
 "Rio" - 4:57  
 "Summertime" (Gershwin, Gershwin, Heyward) - 4:51  
 "St. Louis Blues" (Handy) - 3:39  
 "Ain't Misbehavin'" (Brooks, Razaf, Waller) - 3:41  
 "Misty" (Burke, Garner) - 3:06  
All compositions by McCoy Tyner except as indicated
Recorded at Ambient Recording Studio, Stamford, Connecticut on June 13 & 14, 2000

Personnel
McCoy Tyner - piano

References

McCoy Tyner albums
2000 albums
Telarc Records albums